Etanbetsu Dam  is an earthfill dam located in Hokkaido Prefecture in Japan. The dam is used for irrigation. The catchment area of the dam is 9.1 km2. The dam impounds about 19  ha of land when full and can store 981 thousand cubic meters of water. The construction of the dam was started on 1965 and completed in 1974.

References

Dams in Hokkaido